Roy Higgins may refer to:

 Roy Higgins (cricketer) (1900–1990), Australian cricketer
 Roy Higgins (jockey) (1938–2014), Australian jockey